Stanislav Angelov (born 12 April 1978), also known as Peleto, is a former Bulgarian footballer and currently owner and manager of Levski-Rakovski. Angelov played as a defensive midfielder, sometimes as a fullback or centre back.

Career

CSKA Sofia
Born in Sofia, Angelov started his career at CSKA Sofia, where he played as a left back. He made his first appearance for the club during the 1998–99 season and has been a regular player since the 1999–2000 season. He made his debut on 17 April 1999, in a 0–2 home loss against Metalurg Pernik. Angelov scored his first career goal in a 4–0 win over Shumen on 6 May 2000. In June 2001, Stanislav made a hugely controversial move to CSKA's bitter rivals Levski Sofia. He left CSKA on a free transfer after his contract with the club had expired.

Levski Sofia
Angelov spent six seasons of his career at Levski. During that period, he won three A PFG titles, became a four times holder of the Bulgarian Cup and two times of the Bulgarian Supercup. With Levski he reached the quarter finals of UEFA Cup in 2005–06. In the next season, Levski Sofia reached the group-stage of UEFA Champions League, becoming the first Bulgarian team that reached the groups.

Energie Cottbus
On 13 June 2007, the German club Energie Cottbus officially announced they have signed the player for three years until 2010. That was followed by an immediate reaction from Levski, who denied any such deal, and stated that Angelov was still their player and that he had acted incongruently with the terms of his current contract. After the end of his contract on 30 June 2010 he left Energie Cottbus because he wanted a new challenge.

Steaua București
On 9 July 2010, it was officially announced that Angelov had signed with Steaua. On 19 August 2010, he made his debut for Steaua in the Europa League against Grasshopper. His first match in Liga I was played on 29 August 2010, against FC Timişoara. His contract was ended after only half a season.

Anorthosis
On 4 January 2011, Angelov signed a one-a-half-year deal with Cyprus side Anorthosis Famagusta. On the same day he made his team début, in a 2–0 friendly win against Othellos Athienou. Angelov made his competitive debut for Anorthosis on 8 January in a 2–0 home win against APOEL. He played 90 minutes as a centre back. On 13 February 2011, Angelov scored his first goal for Anorthosis in a 4–1 win against Doxa Katokopias.

Levski Sofia
Angelov returned to Levski during the summer of 2012 and was soon given the captain's armband. On 19 May 2013, he scored a last-minute goal against Ludogorets Razgrad in a crucial derby encounter to put the "bluemen" temporarily in first place in the A PFG standings, but Levski Sofia subsequently failed to win the title, as they were held to a 1–1 draw in their next match against Slavia Sofia.

Angelov played for one more season with Levski before retiring from professional football. His last game was a friendly match organised for the 100th anniversary of Levski against Lazio.

Managing career
In 2014 Angelov become head director of Levski-Rakovski Academy whose parent club was Levski Sofia. In 2017, the club split from Levski Sofia and was run by Angelov as a new club. In 2019, the team joined 4th level of Bulgarian football.

International career
Angelov's debut with the Bulgarian national team was at the 2006 Kirin Cup in Japan.

International goal
Scores and results list Bulgaria's goal tally first, score column indicates score after each Angelov goal.

Career statistics

Honours
Levski Sofia
 Bulgarian Championship: 2002, 2006, 2007
 Bulgarian Cup: 1999, 2002, 2003, 2005, 2007
 Bulgarian Supercup: 2005, 2007

References

External links
 
 
 Profile at Levskisofia.info

1978 births
Living people
Bulgarian footballers
Bulgaria international footballers
Association football defenders
PFC CSKA Sofia players
PFC Levski Sofia players
FC Energie Cottbus players
FC Steaua București players
Anorthosis Famagusta F.C. players
First Professional Football League (Bulgaria) players
Bundesliga players
2. Bundesliga players
Liga I players
Cypriot First Division players
Bulgarian expatriate footballers
Expatriate footballers in Germany
Expatriate footballers in Romania
Expatriate footballers in Cyprus
Association football utility players
Footballers from Sofia